Avatha is a genus of moths in the family Erebidae.

Species
Avatha bipartita (Wileman, 1915)
Avatha bubo (Geyer, 1832)
Avatha chinensis (Warren, 1913)
Avatha complens (Walker, 1858)
Avatha discolor (Fabricius, 1794)
Avatha ethiopica (Hampson, 1913)
Avatha eupepla (Prout, 1924)
Avatha extranea (Berio, 1962)
Avatha garthei (Kobes, 1989)
Avatha gertae (Kobes, 1985)
Avatha heterographa (Hampson, 1912)
Avatha javanica (Roepke, 1941)
Avatha macrostidsa (Hampson, 1913)
Avatha minima (Swinhoe, 1918)
Avatha mixosema (Prout, 1928)
Avatha olivacea Prout
Avatha noctuoides (Guenée, 1852)
Avatha novoguineana (Bethune-Baker, 1906)
Avatha paucimacula (Roepke, 1941)
Avatha pratti (Bethune-Baker, 1906)
Avatha pulcherrima Butler, 1892
Avatha pulchrior Holloway, 2005
Avatha rufiscripta (Hampson, 1926)
Avatha rhynchophora Prout, 1924
Avatha simplex (Roepke, 1951)
Avatha spilota Joicey & Talbot, 1917
Avatha subpunctata Bethune-Baker, 1906
Avatha subumbra (Bethune-Baker, 1906)
Avatha sumatrana (Kobes, 1985)
Avatha tepescens (Walker, 1858)
Avatha tepescoides Holloway, 2005
Avatha uloptera (Prout, 1925)

Former species
Avatha cyanopasta (Turner, 1908) (Platyja)
Avatha expectans (Walker, 1858)
Avatha modesta (Roepke, 1956)
Avatha stigmata (Moore, 1877)

References

External links

 
Cocytiini
Moth genera